Mario Alberto Jacobo Segovia, known as Mario Jacobo (born 2 August 1996) is a Salvadoran professional footballer who plays as a defender for Primera División club Alianza.

International career
He made his debut for the El Salvador national football team on 13 October 2021 in a World Cup qualifier against Mexico. He started the game and was sent off in the 49th minute.

References

External links
 
 

1996 births
Sportspeople from San Salvador
Living people
Salvadoran footballers
El Salvador international footballers
Association football defenders
Alianza F.C. footballers
Salvadoran Primera División players